The pansy is a member of a large group of hybrid plants of the genus Viola cultivated as garden flowers.

Pansy may also refer to:

Places
 Pansy, Arkansas, an unincorporated community
 Pansy, Kentucky, an unincorporated community
 Pansy, Ohio, an unincorporated community
 Pansy, Pennsylvania, an unincorporated community
 Pansy, Manitoba, an unincorporated community
 Pansy, West Virginia, an unincorporated community

People
 Isabella Macdonald Alden (1841–1930), an American author who used the pseudonym "Pansy"

Art, entertainment, and media
 Pansy Parkinson, a minor character in the Harry Potter fiction series
 Pansy (Fabergé egg)

Flora and fauna
 Junonia, a genus of nymphalid butterflies commonly known as pansies
 Sea pansy, a marine organism formed of a collection of polyps

Ships
 HMS Pansy, a Royal Navy Arabis-class sloop completed in 1916 
 USS Pansy (1861), a steamer acquired by the Union Navy from the Union Army during the American Civil War

Other uses
 Pansy, a pejorative term for an effeminate or homosexual man
 Pansy Craze, a gay cultural phenomenon in the United States in the 1930s
 Pansy, the name of the locomotive on the Richmond–Kurrajong railway line
 Pansy, Frank Iero's guitar, which first appeared in the 2006 My Chemical Romance calendar